The 1946 Maine Intercollegiate Athletic Conference football season was the season of college football played by the four member schools of the Maine Intercollegiate Athletic Conference (MIAC) as part of the 1946 college football season. The 1946 season was the first since 1942 in which the four conference teams competed  for the MIAC championship.

The Bates Bobcats won the MIAC championship with a 7–1 record and outscored opponents by a total of 101 to 30.

Conference overview

Teams

Bates

The 1946 Bates Bobcats football team represented Bates College of Lewiston, Maine. In their second, non-consecutive season under head coach Ducky Pond, and after a one-year hiatus in the football program, the Bobcats compiled a perfect 7–0 record during the regular season (3–0 against MIAC opponents), won the MIAC championship, lost to Toledo in the Glass Bowl, shut out five of eight opponents, and outscored all opponents by a total of 101 to 31.

Maine

The 1946 Maine Black Bears football team represented the University of Maine of Orono, Maine. In its second season under head coach George E. Allen, the team compiled a 2–5 record (2–1 against MIAC opponents, 0–3 against Yankee Conference opponents) and finished in second place in the MIAC.

Bowdoin

The 1946 Bowdoin Polar Bears football team represented Bates College of Brunswick, Maine. Led by head coach George D. Shay, the Polar Bears compiled a 2–4 record (1–2 against MIAC opponents), finished third in the MIAC, scored 47 points, and allowed 47 points.

Colby 

The 1946 Colby Mules football team represented Bates College of Waterville, Maine. Led by head coach Daniel G. Lewis, the Polar Bears compiled a 1–6 record (0–3 against MIAC opponents), finished third in the MIAC, and were outscored by a total of 77 to 37.

References